Animal Instincts is an American voyeuristic and erotic 1992 thriller-drama film. The cast includes David Carradine, Shannon Whirry, Jan-Michael Vincent and Maxwell Caulfield. This film spawned two sequels: Animal Instincts 2 (1994) (also with Whirry) and Animal Instincts 3 (also known as Animal Instincts: The Seductress).

Synopsis
Joanna Cole (Whirry) talks of meeting a man named David (Caulfield), the latter may be a police officer. Their marriage is in strong precarious positions, so they resort to involvements in voyeurism and blackmail. The wife begins becoming involved in multiple extramarital affairs to several other men, for which reason Joanna's husband watches her doing that.

But then, mobsters learn about their sexual activities and start getting involved.

Cast
Shannon Whirry as Joanna
Maxwell Caulfield as David
David Carradine as William
Jan-Michael Vincent as Fletcher Ross
Delia Sheppard as Ingrid

Film ratings
Animal Instincts was rated R in the United States for explicit sexual material and profanity. Similar ratings were bestowed on the film in Australia under the Office of Film and Literature Classification Rating Board (for "high level sexual material") and the British Board of Film Classification (BBFC) Rating System Network.

Critical reception
Animal Instincts was given mixed to substandard reviews by audience and film critics. Under Rotten Tomatoes, the audience gave the film only a 14% rating. The Radio Times Magazine bestowed a two-star rating onto the film. The TV Guide Magazine gave an extremely negative review to the film. MUBI, however, was among one of several positive reviews toward the film.

References

External links
 
 
 

1990s erotic thriller films
1992 independent films
American erotic thriller films
1990s English-language films
1990s American films
Films directed by Gregory Dark